The Mecklenburg-Vorpommern State Museum of Technology was founded in 1961 in Schwerin as the Polytechnic Museum (Polytechnisches Museum) and was located in several rooms within Schwerin Castle. Later, it moved to the Marstall buildings next to the castle.

Since December 2012, the technology museum is located at the Phantechnikum in the city of Wismar, 40 km north of Schwerin.

External links 

 Mecklenburg – Vorpommern State Museum of Technology
 phanTECHNIKUM

Museums in Mecklenburg-Western Pomerania
Wismar
Buildings and structures in Nordwestmecklenburg